Leucanopsis zozinna is a moth of the family Erebidae. It was described by William Schaus in 1933. It is found in Colombia.

References

zozinna
Moths described in 1933